The Cold and the Dark: The World after Nuclear War is a 1984 book by Paul R. Ehrlich, Carl Sagan, Donald Kennedy, and Walter Orr Roberts.

Background
It makes dramatic long-lasting climate predictions of the effect a nuclear winter would have on the Earth, an event that is suggested by the authors to follow both a city countervalue strike during a nuclear war, and especially following strikes on oil refineries and fuel depots.

The book was released following a highly publicised 1983 study co-authored by Sagan published in the journal Science.

References 

1984 non-fiction books
American non-fiction books
Books about nuclear issues
Books by Paul R. Ehrlich
English-language books
Works about the theory of history
Works by Carl Sagan
Collaborative non-fiction books